Rio Claro Futebol Clube, commonly referred to as Rio Claro, is a professional association football club based in Rio Claro, São Paulo, Brazil. The team competes in Campeonato Paulista Série A2, the second tier of the São Paulo state football league.

The club's home colours are blue and white and the team mascot is a rooster.

History
On 9 May 1909, the club was founded as Rio Claro Football Club by the teacher Joaquim Arnold, and by the Companhia Paulista das Estradas de Ferro (São Paulo Railroad Company) railroad employees Bento Estevam Siqueira, Constantino Carrocine and João Lambach. Years later, the club was renamed to Rio Claro Futebol Clube.

On 14 July 1928, Rio Claro played its first international match, against H.M.S. Capton's sailors of England.

In 2002, the club won the Campeonato Paulista Fourth Level (named B1), beating Guaratinguetá Esporte Clube in the final. The club was promoted to the following year's third level.

In 2005, Rio Claro was Copa FPF's runner-up. In the final, the club was defeated by Noroeste.

In 2007, the club disputed the Campeonato Paulista Série A1 for the first time. The team also played in Série A1 in 2008, 2010, 2014, 2015 and 2016.

Current squad

Titles
 Campeonato Paulista Série A2: 1928, 1929
 Campeonato Paulista Segunda Divisão: 2002

Stadium
Rio Claro's home stadium is Estádio Augusto Schmidt Filho, usually known as Schimitão or Schimidtão, inaugurated in 1973, with a maximum capacity of 16,000 people.

The club also owns a training ground, named Centro de Treinamento Augusto Schmidt Filho.

Club Colors
Rio Claro's colors are blue and white. The club's home kit is composed of a blue shirt, white short and blue socks.

Mascot
A white rooster wearing the club's blue home kit and with a blue tail, blue crest and blue wattle, named Galo Azul, is the club's mascot. The mascot was chosen after Velo Clube's mascot, which is a red rooster. Velo Clube is Rio Claro's rival.

Nickname
The club was originally nicknamed Aguinha, meaning Little Water, because the club's stadium was located near the Córrego da Servidão's (Servidão's Creek) margin.

Rio Claro's nickname is Azulão, meaning Big Blue.

References

External links
 Rio Claro's official website

 
Association football clubs established in 1909
Football clubs in São Paulo (state)
1909 establishments in Brazil